This is a list of Indian Shaker Church buildings in Washington state. Indian Shaker Church building architecture is unique to the Pacific Northwest, with unadorned, unpainted rectangular wooden structure.

The list is derived from Washington Secretary of State archives unless noted.
Malott
Muckleshoot Indian Reservation—(Auburn)
Mud Bay — Mud Bay Indian Shaker Church was the first Shaker Church
Neah Bay
Nespelem
Nisqually State Park
Nooksack
Oakville
Queets
Skokomish; new church house built 1962
Swinomish
Taholah
Tulalip Indian Reservation—(Marysville): Indian Shaker Church (Marysville, Washington)
Wapato

White Swan — Independent Shaker Church of White Swan
Yakama Indian Reservation—Satus

Mud Bay church

The first Shaker Indian church, also called the "mother church", was built above Mud Bay near Olympia, Washington, near the homes the co-founders of the church.

The original about  church was oriented in an east-west direction, in a manner that would set the pattern for subsequent church architecture.

References

Sources

External links

Indian Shaker Church
Indian Shaker Church
Churches in Washington (state)